Sergipe, officially State of Sergipe, is a state of Brazil. Sergipe borders Bahia to the south and west and Alagoas to the north. Aracaju is the capital and the largest city in the state; the state is divided into 75 municipalities. The state has 1.1% of the Brazilian population and produces only 0.6% of the Brazilian GDP.

Geography
As with most of the states in northeastern Brazil, inland Sergipe is almost entirely savanna (caatinga), and its coastline is characterized by mangroves, swamps and sandy beaches. A small strip of tropical rainforest runs down the coast.

The São Francisco River forms its northern boundary, and the drainage of the northern part of the state is northward and eastward to that river. The southern half of the state slopes eastward and is drained directly into the Atlantic through a number of small rivers, the largest of which are the Irapiranga (whose source in the state of Bahia is called Vaza Barris), the Real and the Cotinguiba. These streams are navigable for short distances, but are obstructed by sandbars at their mouths; because of these, there are no good ports on the coast. The surface of the state resembles, in part, that of Bahia, with a zone of forested lands near the coast and beyond this forested zone lies a higher zone of rough open country, called agreste. There is a sandy belt along the coast, and the western frontier is slightly mountainous. The land in between is very fertile, especially in the forested region where rainfall is abundant. Further inland, the year is divided into wet and dry seasons with occasional prolonged droughts. These are pastoral areas, and the lower fertile lands are cultivated.

The capital of the state is Aracaju (pop. 479 767 in 2003), on the lower course or estuary of the Cotinguiba River, near the coast. The sandbar at the entrance to this river is exceptionally dangerous, and the port is frequented only by coasting vessels of light draught. The city is found on a sandy plain, and there are sand dunes within the city limits. In 1911, the main public buildings included a large plain church with unfinished twin towers, the government palace, the legislative halls, a public school and public hospital.

The other principal towns are Estância - pop. 62,218 (in 2005) on the Rio Real river in the southern part of the state and a center for the manufacturing of cotton-based textiles, cigars, cigarettes and soap as well as an active trade center; Laranjeiras - pop. 26,452 (in 2005), located in a highly productive sugar-growing district north of the capital; Capela - pop. 27,403 (in 2005); Simão Dias - pop. 39,706 (in 2005); Lagarto - pop. 90,345 (in 2005); São Cristóvão, formerly Sergipe d'el-Rey - pop. 75,353 (in 2005), which was also the old colonial capital near the mouth of the Irapiranga.

See also List of municipalities in Sergipe (SE), Brazil.

History

Present-day Sergipe was home to numerous indigenous peoples, including the Kanindé (Canindé), Aratus, and Tupi peoples. Gaspar de Lemos briefly landed in the region in 1501, and the Portuguese Crown declared the region part of the Captaincy of Bahia. São Cristóvão was the site of the first Portuguese settlement, in 1591, at Sergipe D'El-Rey.

As with other states in the northeast, Sergipe was invaded numerous times by the Dutch, and frequently raided by French buccaneers. During the 17th century, the state was known throughout the Americas for its king-wood, a prized commodity that was the primary attraction during the buccaneer raids, and probably a factor in Dutch military expeditions. From 1641 to 1645, the territory belonged to Dutch-controlled Brazil (New Holland). The Dutch built a fort, the first in the region, between the rivers São Francisco and Sergipe.

The Portuguese regained control in 1645. By the 18th century, the Portuguese military had driven off the pirates permanently. Sergipe remained a part of the state of Bahia, and was responsible for a third of Bahia's sugar production by 1723. Sugarcane culture was established in the valleys of the São Francisco, Japaratuba, Sergipe, Vaza-Barris, Piauí and Real rivers. Areas unsuitable for sugarcane plantations on the coast and in the hinterland were developed for livestock; Sergipe subsequently became a supplier of draft animals for the farms of Bahia and Pernambuco. The region was also a significant producer of leather. John VI of Portugal signed a decree to separated Sergipe from Bahia on July 8, 1820, and Brigadier Carlos César Burlamárqui was named the state's first governor.

Sergipe retained its separation from Bahia after the Independence of Brazil in 1822, first briefly as the Captaincy of Sergipe, then as the Province of Sergipe. Economic development was low during the Empire of Brazil in the 19th century, other than a brief cotton boom in the second half of the century. The provincial president Inácio Joaquim Barbosa moved the capital from inland São Cristóvão to coastal Aracaju on the coast on March 17, 1855. Sergipe became a state under the proclamation of the Republic of Brazil in 1892.

20th century

The state saw bitter political disputes in the early 20th century, notably between Fausto Cardoso (1864-1906) and Olímpio Campos. Sergipe became notorious for its outlaws in the 1930s, including Virgolino Ferreira da Silva, better known as Lampião, the "King of Bandits", who terrorized the state for almost a decade until his beheading by the Brazilian police in 1938. His head was later displayed on a pole in a village square.

Coastal Sergipe was attacked by Nazi Germany at the beginning of World War II in response to the rupture of relations between Brazil and the Axis powers. The German submarine U-507, commanded by Harro Schacht, attacked the Baependi, Araraquara, and Aníbal Benévolo off Sergipe between August 15 and 16, 1942. The shipwrecks caused approximately 600 civilian deaths, and German and Italian immigrants communities in Sergipe were persecuted after the attack by mobs. The attacks of the U-507 prompted President Getúlio Vargas to declare war on Germany and Italy on August 22 of the same year.

Demographics

According to the IBGE of 2008, there were 2,030,000 people residing in the state. The population density was 91.3 inhabitants/km2.

Urbanization: 82.2% (2006); Population growth: 2% (1991–2000); Houses: 569,000 (2006).

The last PNAD (National Research for Sample of Domiciles) census revealed the following numbers:  1,240,000 Brown (Multiracial) people (61.08%), 634,000 White people (31.21%), 146,000 Black people (7.22%), 6,000 Amerindian people (0.28%), 4,000 Asian people (0.21%).

Largest cities

Religion  

According to the 2010 demographic census, of the total population of the state, there were 1 579 480 Catholics, 243 330 Protestants Evangelicals, 22 266 Spiritists, 14 755 Jehovah's Witnesses, 6 500 other Christian groups, 5 394 Brazilian Catholic Apostolic Church, 4 371 Umbanda and Candomblecist, 2,326 Mormons, 709 Eastern Orthodox Christians, 509 Buddhists, 501 Spiritualists, 493 Esoteric, 435 belonging to indigenous traditions, 433 new Eastern religious, 184 Jewish and 22 Islamic. There were still 177 620 people without religion, 5 005 with indeterminate (ill-defined) religion or multiple membership, 3 240 did not know and 405 did not declare.

Education 

Portuguese is the official national language, and thus the primary language taught in schools, but English and Spanish are part of the official high school curriculum.

Educational institutions
 Universidade Federal de Sergipe (UFS);
 Instituto Federal de Educação, Ciência e Tecnologia (IFS);
 Universidade Tiradentes (Unit);
 Faculdade Pio Décimo (FPD);
 Faculdade Estácio de Sergipe (ESTÁCIO);
 Faculdade de Administração e Negócios de Sergipe (FANESE);
 Faculdade Amadeus (FAMA);
 Faculdade São Luis de França (FSLF);
 Faculdade Sergipana (FASER);
 Faculdade de Aracaju (FACAR);
 Faculdade Serigy (UNIRB);
 Faculdade Jardins (FAJAR);
 Faculdade Maurício de Nassau (UNINASSAU);

Economy

The industrial sector is the largest component of GDP at 53.9%, followed by the service sector at 39.1%. Agriculture represents 7% of GDP (2004). Sergipe exports include: orange juice 66.1%, urea 20.8%, leather and footwear 4.6%, woven goods 2.3%, other types of juices 2% (2002).

Sergipe's share of the Brazilian economy: 0.7% (2004).

Sergipe's economy is focused around the production of sugarcane (more than 2 million tons produced in 2018, for the manufacture of sugar and ethanol), coconut (2nd largest producer in Brazil in 2017, with 234 million fruits), orange (6th largest producer in Brazil in 2018, with 354 thousand tons) and cassava (153 thousand tons produced in 2018).  A small-scale leather and textile industry also exists.

Sergipe had in 2017 an industrial GDP of R$7 billion, equivalent to 0.6% of the national industry. It employs 67,231 workers in the industry. The main industrial sectors are: Construction (33.1%), Industrial Public Utility Services, such as Electricity and Water (29.0%), Food (9.9%), Non-metallic minerals (2.8%) and Chemicals (2.2%). These 5 sectors concentrate 77.0% of the state's industry.

The Brazilian federal government is also encouraging the development of a fledgling petroleum and natural gas industry.

Notable residents

 Cleovansóstenes de Aguiar (1926–2018): doctor, politician, Mayor of Aracaju (1971-1975) and founder of Sergipe Academy of Medicine;
 Albano do Prado Pimentel Franco (1940): entrepreneur, lawyer, politician, Governor (1995 - 2002), Senator (1983 - 1994) and Federal Deputy (2007 - 2010);
 Carlos Ayres Britto (1942): judge, poet, President of Brazil's Supreme Court and of the National Justice Council (2012);
 Jackson Barreto (1944): lawyer, politician, Vice-Governor (2011–present), Mayor of Aracaju (1986-88 / 1993-94) and Federal Deputy (2003 - 2011);
 Otaviano Canuto (1956): Economist, Professor of Economics University of São Paulo USP.
 Vladimir Souza Carvalho (1950–present): historian, judge, writer, Desembargador of the Regional Federal Court (5th Region)
 Edvaldo Nogueira (1961): politician, Mayor of Aracaju (2006 - 2012)
 Josué Modesto dos Passos Subrinho (1956): Economist, Professor of Economics Federal University of Sergipe
 Sílvio Romero (1851–1914), literary critic and essayist;
 Tobias Barreto (1839–1899), was a notorious Brazilian poet, philosopher, jurist and literary critic;
 Clodoaldo Tavares de Santana (1949), ex-footballer who played for Brazil;
 José Martins Ribeiro Nunes (Zé Peixe) (1927-2012), Legendary figure who drove the boats through the river by swimming;
 Diego Costa (1988), footballer who played for Chelsea F.C.;
 João Batista Nunes de Oliveira (1954), ex-footballer of Clube de Regatas Flamengo where won the Libertadores,  Mundial of  clubs at 1981 and many others championships.

Infrastructure

National Airport
Aracaju International Airport was inaugurated on October 30, 1952 with a runway only 1200 meters in length; the airport did not have an access road until 1958, so after construction of one operating efficiency increased. In 1961 the runway was extended to 1500 meters and a passenger terminal was built in 1962. In February 1975 control of the airport was handed over to Infraero.

Highways
BR-101 and BR-235.

Sports

The state has many professional association football teams, like Club Sportivo Sergipe, Associação Desportiva Confiança from the town of Aracaju and Associação Olímpica de Itabaiana from the town of Itabaiana.  Lagarto Futebol Clube is another important club in Sergipe, it's from Lagarto, city where the Brazilian-born and Spanish-naturalized footballer Diego Costa was born.

Tourism and recreation

São Cristóvão

São Cristóvão is the fourth oldest town in the country, and was Sergipe's state capital until 1855.

As a planned urban settlement, the town contains churches and religious ensembles dating back to the colonial period. Most of these monuments are concentrated around the São Francisco Square.

In 1939, São Cristóvão was designated as a National Treasure by the Instituto do Patrimônio Histórico e Artístico Nacional — IPHAN (the Brazilian National Historical and Artistical Heritage Institute). More recently, in 2010, São Francisco Square in the Town of São Cristóvão became a UNESCO World Heritage Site.

Xingó Canyon

Includes fascinating landscape, rock formations, crystal-clear waters, ecological trails, Caatinga Theme Park, exuberant vegetation and diversified fauna and flora. The Xingó Canyon is located in Canindé do São Francisco, on the banks of the lengthy and well-known São Francisco river. It is the world's fifth most navigable river. The river is formed in a valley reaching up to 170 m deep, being 65 km long and at certain locations between 50 and 300 m wide. The water volume of the canyon is about 3.8 billion m3.

To navigate between the rocks of this gigantic cliff, embedded in the middle of Sergipe's Alto Sertão, is an unforgettable experience.  There are imposing valleys forming a 50 m-high canyon, surrounding a lake that, in certain points, reaches a depth of 190 m.  Nests of herons and river islands complete the spectacle.  The rocks guard traces of the area's first inhabitants who lived there more than 8,000 years ago.

There is also evidence of Lampião's stay there, with his gang of outlaws in more modern times. The Angico trail, in Poço Redondo, leads to a cavern by the same name, where Lampião, Maria Bonita and nine other outlaws lost their lives. Located in the town of Canindé do São Francisco,  from Aracaju, Xingó Canyon is one of the most famous rock formations in the area, embellishing the landscape of the dry Northeastern backwoods. It is hot all year round, but strong winds blowing from December to January keep temperatures at a very comfortable level. Between May and August, it rains frequently.

Sergipe Beaches
Sergipe has an extensive coastline where it is very attractive for tourists from Brazil and the world. The clear and greenish waters, with white sand attract attention. The capital Aracaju also stands out for Praia de Atalaia which is considered the beach with the best beach sidewalk in Brazil. Outside the capital, the coast of Sergipe is highly valued for its distinctive aspect: Praia do Saco (municipality of Estância), a beach located in the south of the state was considered one of the 100 best beaches in the world by the French magazine Les Voyageurs. In it the tourist is faced with sand dunes and an extensive coastal strip that has the peculiarity of Sergipe; Praia da Costa (Barra dos Coqueiros), the Delta of the São Francisco River (Brejo Grande), Praia de Pirambu (Pirambu), are other beaches that enhance the state's tourism.

The river beaches, such as the Croa do Goré sandbar and Ilha dos Namorados, which are tourist attractions reached by Catamaran on the Vaza Barris River in Aracaju, can also be highlighted.

Flag
The stars on the flag of Sergipe represent the number of river estuaries in the state, and the green and yellow stripes represent Sergipe's union with the rest of Brazil. It was designed by José Rodrigues Bastos Coelho, a businessman who felt that Brazilian ships should carry flags to identify their state of origin. It was officially adopted on October 19, 1920.

In 1937, dictator Getúlio Vargas abolished all state flags and symbols, but they were allowed again in 1946. In 1951, when the Sergipe legislature began to consider restoring the state flag, it decided to change the number of stars, so that there would be one for every municipality in the state. In 1952, this new design was scrapped and replaced by the original 5-star design.

References

External links

  Official Website (Agência Sergipe de Notícias - Governo de Sergipe)
  History of Colonial Sergipe

 
States of Brazil

1820s establishments in Brazil
States and territories established in 1820